Blaine County is a county in the U.S. state of Montana. As of the 2020 census, the population was 7,044. Its county seat is Chinook. The county was named for James G. Blaine, former United States Secretary of State. It is on the north line of the state, and thus shares the southern border of Canada opposite Saskatchewan.

History
In 1912 Blaine, Phillips and Hill counties were formed from the area of Chouteau County. The original boundary of Blaine County included a portion of land in the west that is now included in Phillips County.

Geography

The majority of Fort Belknap Indian Reservation is located in the southeastern part of the county.

Features of the area include the Milk River, Bears Paw Mountains, and the Little Rocky Mountains.

Adjacent counties and rural municipalities

 Hill County - west
 Chouteau County - southwest
 Fergus County - south
 Phillips County - east
 Rural Municipality (RM) of Reno No. 51, Saskatchewan (SK) - northwest
 RM of Frontier No. 19, Saskatchewan, SK - north
 RM of Lone Tree No. 18, Saskatchewan, SK - northeast

National protected areas
 Black Coulee National Wildlife Refuge
 Nez Perce National Historical Park (part)
 Upper Missouri River Breaks National Monument (part)

Demographics

2000 census
As of the 2000 United States census, there were 7,009 people, 2,501 households, and 1,793 families living in the county. The population density was 2 people per square mile (1/km2). There were 2,947 housing units at an average density of <1/km2 (1/sq mi). The racial makeup of the county was 52.58% White, 0.17% Black or African American, 45.37% Native American, 0.09% Asian, 0.03% Pacific Islander, 0.23% from other races, and 1.54% from two or more races. 1.00% of the population were Hispanic or Latino of any race. 18.8% were of German and 8.1% Norwegian ancestry. 91.7% spoke English, 3.8% German and 2.0% Dakota as their first language.

There were 2,501 households, out of which 36.00% had children under the age of 18 living with them, 52.30% were married couples living together, 14.40% had a female householder with no husband present, and 28.30% were non-families. 26.00% of all households were made up of individuals, and 10.80% had someone living alone who was 65 years of age or older.  The average household size was 2.78 and the average family size was 3.36.

The county population contained 32.60% under the age of 18, 8.00% from 18 to 24, 24.80% from 25 to 44, 21.60% from 45 to 64, and 12.90% who were 65 years of age or older. The median age was 34 years. For every 100 females there were 97.50 males. For every 100 females age 18 and over, there were 96.30 males.

The median income for a household in the county was $25,247, and the median income for a family was $30,616. Males had a median income of $23,627 versus $20,469 for females. The per capita income for the county was $12,101. About 23.40% of families and 28.10% of the population were below the poverty line, including 36.50% of those under age 18 and 19.90% of those age 65 or over.

2010 census
As of the 2010 United States census, there were 6,491 people, 2,357 households, and 1,604 families living in the county. The racial makeup of the county was 49.4% American Indian, 48.2% white, 0.1% black or African American, 0.1% Asian, 0.2% from other races, and 2.0% from two or more races. Those of Hispanic or Latino origin made up 1.8% of the population. In terms of ancestry, 23.0% were German, 9.2% were Norwegian, 6.6% were Irish, 5.7% were English, and 2.0% were American.

Of the 2,357 households, 39.2% had children under the age of 18 living with them, 45.6% were married couples living together, 16.0% had a female householder with no husband present, 31.9% were non-families, and 28.7% of all households were made up of individuals. The average household size was 2.66 and the average family size was 3.28. The median age was 35.1 years.

The median income for a household in the county was $37,034 and the median income for a family was $40,890. Males had a median income of $32,320 versus $28,986 for females. The per capita income for the county was $16,813. About 23.6% of families and 29.0% of the population were below the poverty line, including 44.6% of those under age 18 and 10.6% of those age 65 or over.

Politics
Blaine County is one of the nation's most consistent long-term bellwether counties. Since 1916, the county has been won by the winner of the presidential election in every election except that of 1988, held during the aftermath of a major drought and farm crisis, when Michael Dukakis won the county by fifty-eight votes. During two other drought years on the Great Plains, Adlai Stevenson II in 1956 and Gerald Ford in 1976 also came close to breaking the county's streak, losing by even smaller vote margins than George H. W. Bush.

Economy
The main industry in Blaine County is agriculture.   The main employers on the Reservation are the Gros Ventre and Assiniboine tribes.

Education
Fort Belknap College is located on the Fort Belknap Indian Reservation. Public high schools in the county include Harlem High School in Harlem, Chinook High School in Chinook, and Turner High School in Turner.

Communities

Cities
 Chinook (county seat)
 Harlem

Census-designated places

 Fort Belknap Agency
 Hartland Colony
 Hays
 Hogeland
 Lodge Pole
 North Harlem Colony
 Turner
 Turner Colony
 Zurich

Unincorporated communities

 Cleveland
 Lloyd
 Lohman
 North Fork
 Rattlesnake
 Savoy

See also
 List of lakes of Blaine County, Montana
 List of mountains in Blaine County, Montana
 National Register of Historic Places listings in Blaine County, MT

References

Further reading

External links

  Blaine County MT - Official Website
 Blaine County MT - Photography

 
Montana counties on the Missouri River
1912 establishments in Montana
Populated places established in 1912